Zhao Ziquan (December 27, 1997) is a Chinese figure skater. She is a two-time Chinese national champion (2016, 2017) and has competed in the free skate at six ISU Championships, including the 2016 World Championships in Boston.

Programs

Competitive highlights
GP: Grand Prix; CS: Challenger Series; JGP: Junior Grand Prix

Detailed results

 QR = Qualifying round

References

External links 

 

1997 births
Living people
Chinese female single skaters
Figure skaters at the 2017 Asian Winter Games
Asian Games competitors for China
Figure skaters from Harbin
Competitors at the 2015 Winter Universiade
Competitors at the 2017 Winter Universiade
Competitors at the 2019 Winter Universiade